Calopogon barbatus, the bearded grass-pink, is a species of orchid native to the southeastern United States, from Louisiana to North Carolina.

References

External links
 Florida Native Orchids, Bearded Grass Pink, Early Grass Pink (Calopogon barbatus)
 Louisiana Department of Wildlife & Fisheries, Rare Plants of Louisiana, Calopogon barbatus - bearded grass - pink
 North Carolina Native Plant Society, native plant gallery, Calopogon barbatus

barbatus
Orchids of the United States
Flora of the Southeastern United States
Flora of the Southern United States
Plants described in 1788
Flora without expected TNC conservation status